Malmyzh is the name of several inhabited localities in Russia.

Urban localities
Malmyzh, Kirov Oblast, a town in Malmyzhsky District of Kirov Oblast; 

Rural localities
Malmyzh, Amursky District, Khabarovsk Krai, a settlement at the station in Amursky District of Khabarovsk Krai
Malmyzh, Nanaysky District, Khabarovsk Krai, a selo in Nanaysky District of Khabarovsk Krai